Veliki Školj is uninhabited islet in the Bay of Mali Ston, located in Bosnia and Herzegovina, and with the nearby islet of Mali Školj makes the only two Bosnia and Herzegovina's islands in the Adriatic Sea.

The temporary regime of the sea border between Croatia and Bosnia and Herzegovina was determined in 1999. The Neum Agreement on the temporary border was signed by Franjo Tuđman and Alija Izetbegović, and has not been ratified due to the emergence of the controversy surrounding the ownership of these two islands and the tip of the Klek peninsula. Croatia disputes the validity of the agreement and claims it as its own territory.

Sources

References

Islands of the Adriatic Sea
Uninhabited islands
Islands of Bosnia and Herzegovina
Islands of Croatia
Disputed islands